Tomás Eduardo Velásquez (born 18 December 1957) is a Costa Rican footballer. He competed in the men's tournament at the 1980 Summer Olympics.

References

1957 births
Living people
Costa Rican footballers
Costa Rica international footballers
Olympic footballers of Costa Rica
Footballers at the 1980 Summer Olympics
People from Guanacaste Province
Association football midfielders
Puntarenas F.C. players